Jan Kavan (born 17 October 1946 in London) is a former Czech politician and diplomat.

Biography
Kavan was born in London as the son of a Czechoslovak diplomat, Pavel Kavan, and a British teacher, Rosemary Kavanová. Kavan moved back to Czechoslovakia with his parents as a child. His father was then arrested in a Communist Party purge and sentenced to 25 years in prison in a show trial in the 1950s. He was eventually released, but died in 1960 aged 46. Kavan's mother later wrote a memoir, Love and Freedom. Kavan was one of the student leaders of the Prague Spring movement in 1968. When the movement was crushed by the Soviet occupation of Czechoslovakia, Kavan emigrated to the United Kingdom, the country of his birth.

Kavan is member of the Czech Social Democratic Party (ČSSD). He was the Minister of Foreign Affairs of the Czech Republic from 1998 to 2002 and one of the deputy prime ministers from 1999 to 2002. He was a member of the Czechoslovak Federal Assembly from 1990 to 1992, member of the Senate of the Czech Republic from 1996 to 2000, and a member of the Chamber of Deputies from 2002 to 2006. He was elected President of the United Nations General Assembly and acted in this office from 2002 to 2003.

Before returning to former Czechoslovakia after the fall of the Communist government, Kavan spent 20 years in exile in the UK. While in exile he was the editor-in-chief of the Palach Press, a press agency. He was also editor of the East European Reporter and Vice-President of the East European Cultural Foundation, both organizations having been founded by him. In 1991, back in Czechoslovakia, Kavan was wrongly accused of collaboration with the Czechoslovak secret service (StB) in the years 1969-1970. He was totally cleared of the charges by a Prague Municipal Court in 1994 and finally, after a renewed process, by a Court of Appeals in January 1996.

He received several honorary degrees, including Honorary Fellow of the London School of Economics, Honorary Professor of Human Rights, Adelphi University of New York, and a number of human rights awards including Companion of Honour (UK), International Order of Merit (UK), and Presidential Roll of Honor (USA).

Kavan was educated at the Charles University in Prague, the London School of Economics and the University of Reading. He is divorced and has four children.

External links
 Biography at the Ministry of Foreign Affairs of the Czech Republic
 Biography
General Assembly President Jan Kavan's timeline on the pages of United Nations

References

1946 births
Living people
Foreign Ministers of the Czech Republic
Presidents of the United Nations General Assembly
English people of Czech descent
Permanent Representatives of the Czech Republic to the United Nations
Alumni of the University of Reading
Alumni of the London School of Economics
Czech Social Democratic Party MPs
Czech Social Democratic Party Senators
Czech Social Democratic Party Government ministers
Honorary Fellows of the London School of Economics
Charles University alumni
Members of the Chamber of Deputies of the Czech Republic (2002–2006)